Chapra Christ Church commonly known as Chapra Church is one of the oldest Christian church in Nadia district. It is situated in Bangaljhi, Chapra in the Indian state of West Bengal.

History

Chapra was the center of Missionary works of Meherpur sub division of undivided Bengal. In 1839 the German Missionaries Rev. C. Cruckeberg and Mr. P. Ansorge started the missionary work at Chapra. The Church was built in 1840 and work of the church commenced in 1941. A school was started in 1850 under the governance of Chapra Church. This is a Roman Catholic Church. The new church was built in 1959 and dedicated to the Sacred Heart of Jesus. Presently it is a sub-station of Krishnagar Church.

References

Roman Catholic churches in West Bengal
Roman Catholic churches in India
Rebuilt buildings and structures in India
Churches in West Bengal
1840 establishments in British India

External links